Naum Krasner (21 February 1924 – 5 March 1999) was a Russian mathematician and economist.

A former colonel in the Soviet Army, he joined Voronezh State University as a student in 1957 and, on graduating in 1961, joined the faculty there. In 1969 he became Methods of Operational Research Chair and, later, vice-dean of the Faculty of Applied Mathematics and Mechanics.

References

External links 
 In memory of Naum Krasner

1924 births
1999 deaths
Soviet economists
Soviet mathematicians
20th-century Russian mathematicians
20th-century  Russian economists
Voronezh State University alumni
Ukrainian mathematicians
Ukrainian Jews
Soviet Army officers